Velocify, Inc. is a cloud computing company,headquartered in El Segundo, California, that provides cloud-based intelligent sales automation software,designed for fast-paced sales environments.

History
Velocify was co-founded in 2004 by Jeff Solomon, Charles Chase and Tony Christopoulos as a company specializing in software as a service (SaaS). The company raised $3.25M in Series A funding in October 2007 with Rustic Canyon Partners as the initial investor. 

In May 2011, Velocify named Nick Hedges President & Chief Executive Officer. In 2011 and 2012 Nick Hedges was named one of the “50 Most Influential in Sales Lead Management” by the Sales Lead Management Association. In February 2012, Velocify completed a $15 million Series B fundraising round led by Volition Capital with participation from existing investor Rustic Canyon Partners. In November 2012, Velocify established a partnership with Marketo. The company announced it changed its name to Velocify from Leads360 on June 19, 2013, to reflect the company's vision for the future. In October 2017, Velocify was acquired by Ellie Mae, Inc. the leading cloud-based platform for the mortgage finance industry. 

In August 2020, Intercontinental Exchange acquired Ellie Mae.

Awards
Ranked 2023 (2013), 1851 (2014), & 2500 (2017) on the Inc. 5000 annual list.
Velocify was ranked in the Deloitte Technology Fast 500 in 2011, 2012, and 2013.
Ranked in Los Angeles Business Journal's “Best Places to Work” in Southern California in 2010, 2011, 2012, and 2013.
Stevie Award for Sales Technology Partner of the Year in 2013

Products
Velocify offers two products, a sales automation platform, LeadManager, and an integrated cloud-based dialing platform, Dial-IQ. In 2013, Velocify launched Dial-IQ, a cloud-based calling service for businesses. In August 2014, the company released Velocify for Salesforce, which offers sales automation and dialing within the cloud-based CRM platform. In 2016, Velocify launched LoanEngage, a CRM platform for mortgage marketing and sales.

References

External links
Velocify, Inc.

Cloud applications
Software distribution
Marketing companies of the United States
As a service
Defunct software companies of the United States
Information technology companies of the United States